The Instituto San Sebastián de Yumbel (ISS), initially known as Seminario de San Sebastián de Yumbel, is a private Catholic pre-school, primary, and secondary school located in Yumbel, Bío Bío Province, Chile.

The school offers education at the Pre-school (Educación Parvularia), Primary (Educación Básica) and Secondary (Enseñanza Media) levels. It is one of the oldest institutions in the Bio Bio Region, playing an important philanthropic role in the Yumbel commune.

History 
The institute was founded by Archbishop José Hipólito Salas, with the personal approval of Pope Pius IX. It was initially known as Seminario de San Sebastián de Yumbel (English: Seminary of St. Sebastian of Yumbel) which appeared in public records until 1905.

The school was founded upon Catholic-based prayer and theological discussion, which remain important to school practices and ceremonies.

The school underwent a large-scale renovation in late 2007, including a new pavilion, classrooms, restrooms, showers and a computer lab. The renovations, managed by the Educational Foundation Cristo Rey, were a major success.

Institutional anthem

See also

 Catholic Church in Chile
 Education in Chile

References

External links
 , the school's official website (in Spanish)

1879 establishments in Chile
Educational institutions established in 1879
Catholic primary schools in Chile
Catholic secondary schools in Chile
Schools in Biobío Region